The Port of Kokkola is a cargo port located in the city of Kokkola, on the west coast of Finland and the eastern shore of the Bothnian Bay.

Facilities
The port complex consists of three areas:
Kantasatama 'core' harbour: containerised and general cargo as well as 'clean' bulk; facilities include a covered 'all-weather-terminal'; 5 quays, total length ; depth of fairways 
Hopeakivi harbour: mainly dealing with light bulk cargo; 2 quays, total length ; depth 
Deepwater harbour: mainly dealing with bulk cargo, accounting for  70% of the port's total throughput; 6 quays, total length ; depth 

In 2018, the port handled  6.7 million tons of international cargo. Of this,  77% was exports, making Kokkola the fourth-largest export port in Finland, by tonnage.

See also
Tankar Lighthouse

References

External links

Kokkola
Water transport in Finland
Kokkola